The Behram-Begova Medresa is the oldest educational institution found in northeastern Bosnia and Herzegovina. Relevant historical sources suggest that it began operating before 1626. It was built in the Arab-Moorish style, and throughout its history it has been  restored and rebuilt repeatedly.

References

Schools in Bosnia and Herzegovina

Buildings and structures in Tuzla
Education in Tuzla